The 1962 South African Grand Prix, formally titled the 9th International RAC Grand Prix of South Africa, was a Formula One motor race held at East London on 29 December 1962. It was the ninth and final race in both the 1962 World Championship of Drivers and the 1962 International Cup for Formula One Manufacturers. The 82-lap race was won by Graham Hill driving a BRM, the Englishman taking his first Drivers' Championship in the process, with New Zealander Bruce McLaren and local driver Tony Maggs second and third, respectively, in works Cooper-Climaxes.

Hill went into the race with a nine-point lead in the Drivers' Championship over Scotland's Jim Clark, driving a works Lotus-Climax. A Clark win would give him the championship regardless of Hill's performance because only the top 5 results counted for the championship. After taking pole position, Clark led comfortably until an oil leak 20 laps from the finish forced him to retire, handing the championship to Hill. The win also gave BRM their first and only Manufacturers' Cup.

Classification

Qualifying 

  – Bruce Johnstone was unable to set a time in qualifying due to engine problems, and consequently had to start from the back of the grid.
 † — Jim Clark (1:28.9) and Trevor Taylor posted faster times in their back-up machines, fitted with fuel-injection engines, but these cars were discarded for the race due to reliability issues.

Race

Championship standings after the race

Drivers' Championship standings

Constructors' Championship standings

 Notes: Only the top five positions are included for both sets of standings. Only the best 5 results counted towards the Championship. Numbers without parentheses are Championship points; numbers in parentheses are total points scored.

References

South African Grand Prix
Grand Prix
East London, Eastern Cape
South African Grand Prix
South African Grand Prix